The following highways are numbered 704:

Canada

Costa Rica
 National Route 704

United States